Joaquín or Joaquin is a male given name, the Spanish version of Joachim.

Given name
 Joaquín (footballer, born 1956), Spanish football midfielder
 Joaquín (footballer, born 1981), Spanish football winger
 Joaquín (footballer, born 1982), Spanish football forward
 Joaquín Almunia, Spanish politician
 Joaquín Andújar, professional baseball player in the Houston Astros organization
 Joaquín Arias, professional baseball player in the San Francisco Giants organization
 Joaquín Balaguer, President of the Dominican Republic
 Joaquín Belgrano, Argentine patriot
 Joaquín Benoit, professional baseball player for the San Diego Padres
 Joaquin Castro, American politician from San Antonio, Texas
 Joaquín Cortés, Spanish flamenco dancer
 Joaquín De Luz, Spanish New York City Ballet principal dancer
 Joaquin Domagoso, Filipino actor and model
 Joaquín "El Chapo" Guzmán, Mexican drug lord
 Joaquín Hernández, Mexican footballer
 Joaquín "Jack" García, Cuban-American FBI agent
 Joaquín Francisco Pacheco (1808–1865), Prime Minister of Spain
 Joaquín Gutiérrez Cano (1920–2009), Spanish diplomat and politician
 Joaquín Lavín, Chilean politician for the Independent Democrat Union
 Joaquín Maurín, Spanish Catalan leader of the Workers' Party of Marxist Unification (POUM) and the Workers and Peasants Bloc
 Joaquín Miguel Elizalde (1896–1965), Filipino diplomat, businessman and polo player
 Joaquin Miller (1837–1913), American poet and frontiersman
 Joaquin Murrieta (1829–1853), Mexican-Californian 19th century outlaw
 Joaquín Pardavé (1900–1955), Mexican actor, director, songwriter and screenwriter of the Mexican cinema (1900–1955)
 Joaquin Phoenix (born 1974), American actor
 Joaquín Rodrigo (1901–1999), Spanish composer of classical music, especially for the guitar
 Joaquín Sabina (born 1949), Spanish singer-songwriter and poet
 Joaquín Salvador Lavado "Quino" (1932–2020), Argentine-Spanish cartoonist
 Joaquín Sorolla (1863–1923), Spanish artist
 Joaquin Szuchman (born 1995), Israeli-Argentinian professional basketball player
 Joaquín Turina (1882–1949), Spanish composer of classical music
 Joaquín Zavala (1835–1906), President of Nicaragua

Surname 

 Jaymee Joaquin, Filipina actress and TV presenter
 Nick Joaquin, Filipino author
 Waldis Joaquín, Dominican baseball pitcher for the San Francisco Giants

Fictional characters
 Commander Joaquin, a character in the anime Mobile Suit Gundam SEED C.E. 73: Stargazer
 Joaquín de la Vega, son of Alejandro Murrieta “Zorro” de la Vega in Mask of Zorro and  The Legend of Zorro

See also 

 Hurricane Joaquin
 San Joaquin (disambiguation)

References 

Masculine given names
Spanish masculine given names